Marcin Bors (born May 30, 1978), is a Polish record producer, sound engineer and multi-instrumentalist.

He started working as a sound engineer in the late 1990s, mostly with heavy metal bands such as Artrosis, Lost Soul and Moonlight among others. In the late 2000s, Bors became a prominent producer for the Polish alternative rock music scene. Over the years he worked for such groups as Hey, Pogodno, Muchy, Myslovitz and Hurt among others. Although recognized as a rock producer, he also worked with hip-hop and reggae artists Donguralesko, Mesajah, Jamal and Mrozu.
 
In 2010 Marcin Bors, with Paweł Krawczyk, received the Fryderyk, an annual award in the Polish music industry, in the Best Production category (Produkcja muzyczna roku). Between 2008 and 2013 Bors received seven other nominations for that award.

In 2014 he became a judge in the TVP2 television series SuperSTARcie, based on the Norwegian singing competition The Ultimate Entertainer, which is itself based on the Vietnamese competition Tuyệt đỉnh tranh tài.

Bors owns and runs Fonoplastykon Studio in Wrocław, Poland.

Discography

References

1978 births
Living people
Polish guitarists
Polish male guitarists
Polish drummers
Male drummers
Multi-instrumentalists
Polish record producers
Polish keyboardists
21st-century guitarists
21st-century drummers
21st-century male musicians